Hadath is a municipality in the Baabda District of the Mount Lebanon Governorate in Lebanon. It borders the southern periphery of the Lebanese capital Beirut and is considered part of its metropolitan area. 

It was discovered and a collection made by Auguste Bergy from a spur near a ravine south of the last houses in the village. Heavy Neolithic material of the Qaraoun culture was found of an atypical variety with large, rough flakes including picks, choppers and cores. Some examples showed evidence of burin impacts and twisted forms. The area is now built up.

References

Heavy Neolithic sites
Neolithic settlements
Archaeological sites in Lebanon
Maronite Christian communities in Lebanon
Shia Muslim communities in Lebanon